Khorramabad District is a district (bakhsh) in Tonekabon County, Mazandaran Province, Iran. At the 2006 census, its population was 37,517, in 10,453 families.  The District has one city: Khorramabad. The District has three rural districts (dehestan): Baladeh Rural District, Do Hezar Rural District, and Seh Hezar Rural District.

References 

Tonekabon County
Districts of Mazandaran Province